Gordāfarīd is one of the heroines in the Shāhnāmeh "The Book of Kings" or "The Epic of Kings", an enormous poetic opus written by the Persian poet Hakīm Abū l-Qāsim Ferdowsī Tūsī around 1000 AD. She was a champion who fought against Sohrab (another Iranian hero who was the commander of the Turanian army) and delayed the Turanian troops who were marching on Persia. She is a symbol of courage and wisdom for Iranian women.

References

 Abolqasem Ferdowsi, Dick Davis trans. (2006), Shahnameh: The Persian Book of Kings , modern English translation (abridged), current standard. See also
 Levy, Reuben (translator), The Epic of the Kings: Shah-Nama, the National Epic of Persia, (Mazda Publications, 1996) (abridged prose version)
 Warner, Arthur and Edmond Warner, (translators) The Shahnama of Firdausi, 9 vols. (London: Keegan Paul, 1905–1925) (complete English verse translation)
 Shirzad Aghaee, Nam-e kasan va ja'i-ha dar Shahnama-ye Ferdousi(Personalities and Places in the Shahnama of Ferdousi, Nyköping, Sweden, 1993.

Women in Shahnameh